The 1990 German Open was a men's tennis tournament played on outdoor clay courts. It was the 84th edition of the Hamburg Masters (Hamburg Masters), and was part of the ATP Super 9 of the 1990 ATP Tour. It took place at the Rothenbaum Tennis Center in Hamburg, West Germany, from 7 May through 14 May 1990.

The men's field was headlined by ATP No. 3, Brussels, Stuttgart titlist, Australian Open, Monte Carlo quarter-finalist Boris Becker, Miami, San Francisco winner, recent Indian Wells finalist Andre Agassi and Tokyo Outdoor winner and U.S. Open semi-finalist Aaron Krickstein. Other top seeds were Estoril titlist Emilio Sánchez, Jay Berger, Andrés Gómez and Michael Chang.

Finals

Singles

 Juan Aguilera defeated  Boris Becker, 6–1, 6–0, 7–6(9–7),
It was Juan Aguilera's 2nd title of the year, and his 5th overall. It was his 1st Masters title of the year, and overall.

Doubles

 Sergi Bruguera /  Jim Courier defeated  Udo Riglewski /  Michael Stich, 7–6, 6–2

References

External links
   
 Association of Tennis Professionals (ATP) tournament profile

 
Hamburg European Open
German Open
May 1990 sports events in Europe